François Blais ( – ) was a Canadian writer from Quebec who received the 2020 Governor General's Award for French-language children's literature for his novel Lac Adélard.

Biography 
François Blais was born in 1973 in the small town of Grand-Mère in the Mauricie region of Quebec. He grew up in a house with a library filled with titles like Tintin, Bob Morane, and books from the Countess of Ségur.

He published his first novel, Iphigénie en Haute-Ville at the age of 32 in 2006, which quickly became a finalist for several literary prizes, namely the Prix des libraires du Québec, the Prix France-Québec and the Prix Senghor de la création littéraire.  Although he had until then worked primarily as a translator, Blais published a book almost every year, and beginning in 2016, had alternated between adult and children's books all while being employed as a night custodian for a shopping centre in Trois-Rivières.

Blais was also particularly stingy with biographical details in the rare interviews he did grant.  His work was first translated in 2018, when his novel Document 1 appeared in English under the same title.  Blais lived in Quebec City, and in 2016, moved to a farm in the village of Charette in the county of  Maskinongé in Quebec where he lived with his sister.

He died at the age of 49 on May 14, 2022 at his home in Charette, Quebec, where he had lived since 2016 with his sister.

On December 16, 2022, the Quebec Ministry of Health and Social Services issued a warning about his novel The Boy with Upside-Down Feet, claiming that the book could incite young readers to suicide. There was a swift and negative public reaction to the warning from the media and the literary and medical communities.

Works 
Blais' novels contain autobiographical elements, which are often rooted in his hometown of Grand-Mère in Quebec.  Since his works are initially characterized by quirky and scathing humour, he never resorted to autofiction.

His sixth novel, La classe de Madame Valérie, which traces the life of a group of 11-year-old classmates at Laflèche school in Grand-Mère, Quebec, was published in 2013, and received praise from many, and in particular from veteran Quebec journalist Pierre Foglia.

Un livre sur Mélanie Cabay, inspired by the 1994 disappearance and death of a young woman was published in 2018.  In 2020, his novel Lac Adélard, won the Governor General's Award for French-language children's literature at the 2020 Governor General's Awards.

His 2012 novel Document 1 was published in English in 2018 by Book*hug in a translation by JC Sutcliffe, under the same title. It was the first of his works to be translated in another language.

Novels and short stories 
 2006 – Iphigénie en Haute-Ville (L’instant même) 
 2007 – Nous autres ça compte pas (L’instant même) 
 2008 – Le Vengeur masqué contre les hommes-perchaude de la lune (L’instant même) 
 2009 – Vie d’Anne-Sophie Bonenfant (L’instant même) 
 2011 – La nuit des morts-vivants (L’instant même) 
 2012 – Document 1 (L’instant même) 
 2013 – La classe de madame Valérie (L’instant même) 
 2014 – Sam (L’instant même) 
 2015 – Cataonie (short stories) (L’instant même) 
 2017 – Les Rivières, suivi de Les Montagnes : Deux histoires de fantômes (short stories) (L’instant même) 
 2018 – Un livre sur Mélanie Cabay (L’instant même) 
 2021 – La seule chose qui intéresse tout le monde (L'instant même)

Children's books 
 2016 – 752 lapins (400 coups) 
 2017 – Le livre où la poule meurt à la fin (400 coups) 
 2019 – Lac Adélard, illustrated by Iris Boudreau (La courte échelle) 
 2020 – L’Horoscope (400 coups)

Collaborations 
 2015 – "Nous avons un problème", collection of short stories Il n’y a que les fous (L’instant même)

Awards and honours 
 Governor General's Award for French-language children's literature, laureate in 2020 for Lac Adélard, illustrated by Iris Boudreau (La courte échelle)
 Prix jeunesse des libraires du Québec, laureate 2021 in the 12–17 years old category for Lac Adélard, illustrated by Iris Boudreau
 Prix jeunesse des libraires, co-laureate in 2019 in the 6–11 years old category with Valérie Boivin for Le livre où la poule meurt à la fin  (Les 400 coups)
 Prix des libraires, finalist in 2014 for his novel La classe de madame Valérie (L’instant même)
 Prix de création littéraire de la Bibliothèque de Québec-Salon international du livre de Québec, laureate in 2013 for his novel Document 1
 Prix des libraires, finalist in 2013 for his novel Document 1 (L’instant même)
 Prix des libraires, finalist in 2007 for his novel Iphigénie en Haute-Ville (L’instant même)

References 

1973 births
2022 deaths
21st-century Canadian writers
Canadian writers in French
French Quebecers
French
Writers from Quebec
People from Shawinigan